Thomas Mike McCormick (May 16, 1930 – September 20, 2012) was an American football player and coach.  He played professionally as a halfback in the National Football League (NFL) for the Los Angeles Rams and San Francisco 49ers. He played college football at the University of Pacific.

McCormick was drafted by the Los Angeles Rams in the eighth round (97th overall) of the 1952 NFL Draft.  He played three seasons for the Rams from 1953 to 1955.  He then played for the San Francisco 49ers in 1956.

During his four-year career he played in 32 games and gained 272 yards rushing on 86 carries. He had one career touchdown. As a kick return man he gained 10 yards on 9 punt returns and 243 yards on 11 kickoff returns for the Rams and 49ers. He recovered four fumbles during his professional career.

McCormick was as an assistant coach under Norm Van Brocklin with the Minnesota Vikings and under Vince Lombardi for the Super Bowl Champion Green Bay Packers.

References

1930 births
2012 deaths
American football halfbacks
American football running backs
Green Bay Packers coaches
Los Angeles Rams players
Minnesota Vikings coaches
Pacific Tigers football players
Players of American football from San Francisco
Players of American football from Texas
San Francisco 49ers players
Sportspeople from Waco, Texas